Lazarus W. Powell (1812–1867) was a U.S. Senator from Kentucky from 1859 to 1865. Senator Powell may also refer to:

Beverly Powell (born 1951), Texas State Senate
Clifford Ross Powell (1893–1973), New Jersey State Senate
E. Henry Powell (1839–1911), Vermont State Senate
Eric Powell (politician) (born 1966), Mississippi State Senate
Jeremiah Powell (fl. 1780s), Massachusetts State Senate
Larry Powell (Kansas politician) (born 1939), Kansas State Senate
Max L. Powell (1869–1941), Vermont State Senate
Walter E. Powell (1931–2020), Ohio State Senate

See also
John Hare Powel (1786–1856), Pennsylvania